Nene Macdonald (born 11 May 1994) is a Papua New Guinean professional rugby league footballer who plays as a er or  for the Leeds Rhinos in the Super League and Papua New Guinea at international level.

He previously played for the Sydney Roosters, Gold Coast Titans, St George Illawarra Dragons, North Queensland Cowboys and the Cronulla-Sutherland Sharks in the National Rugby League, the Northern Pride RLFC and the Norths Devils in the Intrust Super Cup, the Wyong Roos and the Newtown Jets in the NSW Cup and the World All Stars at representative level.

Background
Born in Port Moresby, Papua New Guinea, Macdonald moved to Queensland, Australia at a young age and played his junior football for the Cairns Brothers, before being signed by the Gold Coast Titans.

In October 2005, Macdonald played for the Australian Schoolboys.

Playing career

2012
In 2012, he joined the Sydney Roosters. He played for the Roosters' NYC team in 2012 and 2013. In 2013 and 2014, he played for the Queensland Under-20s team. In 2013, he played for Papua New Guinea against the Prime Minister's XIII team, scoring a try.

2013

In 2013, Macdonald was selected in the Papua New Guinea squad for the 2013 World Cup. He played in 3 matches and scored three tries and a field goal in Papua New Guinea's 9-8 defeat by France.

2014
On 11 February 2014, Macdonald was selected in the Roosters' inaugural 2014 NRL Auckland Nines squad. In Round 11 of the 2014 NRL season, he made his NRL debut for the Roosters against the Canterbury-Bankstown Bulldogs on the wing and scored a try in the Roosters' 32-12 win at ANZ Stadium. He finished his debut year in the NRL having played 7 games and scoring 3 tries for the Roosters. On 2 September 2014, he was named on the wing in the 2014 NYC Team of the Year.

2015
On 31 January and 1 February, Macdonald again played for the Roosters' in the 2015 NRL Auckland Nines. On 2 May, he played for Papua New Guinea against Fiji in the 2015 Melanesian Cup, playing on the wing in the Papua New Guinea's 22-10 loss at Cbus Super Stadium. 

On 16 June, he signed a -year contract with the Gold Coast Titans mid-season effective immediately. He made his club debut for the Titans in Round 15 against the New Zealand Warriors, playing at centre in the Titans' 36-14 loss at Cbus Super Stadium. In his next match in Round 16 against his former club the Sydney Roosters, he scored his first try for the Titans in their 20-10 loss at Central Coast Stadium. He finished off the 2015 season having played in 4 matches for the Roosters and 11 matches for the Titans, scoring 4 tries. On 15 December, he was named on interchange bench for the World All Stars to play against the Indigenous All Stars on 16 February 2016.

2016
On 12 January, Macdonald was selected in the QAS Emerging Maroons squad. In February, he played for the Titans in the 2016 NRL Auckland Nines. On 13 February, he played for the World All Stars against the Indigenous All Stars in the 2016 All Stars match, playing on the wing in his team's 12-8 win at Suncorp Stadium. On 7 May, he played for Papua New Guinea against Fiji in the 2016 Melanesian Cup, playing at centre and scoring a try in Papua New Guinea's 24-22 win at Parramatta Stadium. In August, he signed a 3-year contract with the St George Illawarra Dragons starting in 2017. He finished the 2016 season having played in 23 matches and scoring 10 tries in his last year with the Titans.

2017
In February 2017, Macdonald was named in the Dragons 2017 NRL Auckland Nines squad. On 10 February 2017, Macdonald played for the World All Stars against the Indigenous All Stars in the 2017 All Stars match, playing on the wing and scoring a try in the 34-8 loss at Hunter Stadium. In Round 1 of the 2017 NRL season, Macdonald made his club debut for the St George Illawarra Dragons against the Penrith Panthers, playing on the wing in the 42-10 win at Jubilee Oval.

Macdonald played for Papua New Guinea in the 2017 Rugby League World Cup.

2018
On 9 October, Macdonald signed a three-year contract with the North Queensland Cowboys starting in 2019.

2019
In March, Macdonald was dropped from a pre-season trial game against the Melbourne Storm for being late to training.

In round 1 of the 2019 NRL season, Macdonald made his debut for North Queensland, scoring a try in their 24–12 victory over his former club, the St George Illawarra Dragons. In round 5, he suffered a fracture and dislocation of his ankle in the club's 12–18 defeat by the Melbourne Storm.

On 20 June, he was involved in a traffic incident, in which a hired car leased in his name was found damaged and abandoned on Magnetic Island. On 5 July, he was released by North Queensland.

2020
On 11 June, Macdonald signed a contract to join Cronulla-Sutherland after twelve months out of the game.

Macdonald made his debut for Cronulla-Sutherland in round 9 against Penrith and scored a try as Cronulla were beaten 56-24 at Kogarah Oval.

2021
Macdonald joined the Norths Devils and played four games for the Queensland Cup club, including their 16-10 grand final win over the Wynnum Manly Seagulls.

On 5 November, he signed a train and trial deal with Brisbane worth $1000 a week.

On 29 November, it was announced that Macdonald had signed to play for Leigh in the Betfred Championship under Leigh' Papua New Guinean head coach Adrian Lam.

2022
In round 1 of the 2022 Championship season, MacDonald scored a hat-trick on his club debut for Leigh in their 50-4 victory over Whitehaven R.L.F.C.
On 28 May, Macdonald played for Leigh in their 2022 RFL 1895 Cup final victory over Featherstone.  On 10 July, Macdonald scored a hat-trick in Leigh's 66-0 victory over Workington Town.
On 3 October 2022, Macdonald played for Leigh in their Million Pound Game victory over Batley which saw the club promoted back to the Super League.
On the 1st December 2022 Leeds Rhinos announced that Macdonald had joined from Leigh Leopards for the 2023 season with a pre season friendly being announced as part of the deal.

Statistics

NRL
 Statistics are correct as of round 9 of the 2020 season

International

References

External links
NRL profile

1994 births
Living people
Cronulla-Sutherland Sharks players
Gold Coast Titans players
Leeds Rhinos players
Leigh Leopards players
North Queensland Cowboys players
NRL All Stars players
Papua New Guinea national rugby league team players
Papua New Guinean emigrants to Australia
Papua New Guinean rugby league players
People educated at Kirwan State High School
Rugby league centres
Rugby league wingers
St. George Illawarra Dragons players
Sydney Roosters players
Wyong Roos players